Davis, according to one source, derives from the French Devis.

Davis is a masculine given name which may refer to:

People

A
Davis Agesa (born 1995), Kenyan footballer
Davis Allen (1916–1999), American interior designer
Davis Allen (American football) (born 2001), American football player
Davis Arinaitwe (born 1987), Ugandan cricketer

B
Davis Evan Bedford (1898–1978), British physician
Dāvis Bertāns (born 1992), Latvian basketball player
Davis Bitton (1930–2007), American historian
Davis Eugene Boster (1920–2005), American diplomat
Davis Burleson (born 2003), American social media personality

C
Davis Carpenter (1799–1878), American politician
Davis Cheek (born 1999), American football player
Davis Chenge (born 1991), Kenyan rugby union footballer
Davis Chiramel (born 1960), Indian priest
Davis Chirchir (born 1960), Kenyan politician
Davis Cleveland (born 2002), American actor
Davis Coombe, American filmmaker
Davis Croghan (1832–1890), Irish Archdeacon
Davis Cunningham (1916–1984), American musician
Davis Curiale (born 1987), Italian footballer

D
Davis Daniel (born 1961), American musician
Davis Rich Dewey (1858–1942), American economist
Davis Deza (born 1991), Peruvian footballer
Davis Doi (born 1957), American animator
Davis Drewiske (born 1984), American ice hockey player
Davis Ducart (??–1780), Irish architect

E
Davis Earle (??–2016), Canadian physicist
Davis Elkins (1876–1959), American politician

F
Davis Filfred (born 1967), American politician
Davis Fisher (born 1997), American motorcycle racer
Davis Floyd (1776–1834), American politician

G
Davis Gaines (born 1959), American stage actor
Davis Gillilan (1812–1852), American merchant
Davis Granados (born 1981), Colombian footballer
Davis Grubb (1919–1980), American novelist
Davis Guggenheim (born 1963), American film director

H
Davis Hughes (1910–2003), Australian politician

I
Dāvis Ikaunieks (born 1994), Latvian footballer
Dāvis Indrāns (born 1995), Latvian footballer

J
Davis Idin Pareli Johansen (born 1926), Norwegian politician
Davis Joseph (born 1963), Canadian cricketer

K
Davis Kamoga (born 1968), Ugandan athlete
Davis Kamukama, Ugandan businessman
Davis Katsonga (born 1955), Malawian politician
Davis Keillor-Dunn (born 1997), English footballer
Davis Kopi (born 1971), Botswanan footballer

L
Davis Love Jr. (1935–1988), American golfer
Davis Love III (born 1964), American golfer
Davis Lusimbo (born 1966), Ugandan boxer

M
Davis Mac-Iyalla (born 1972), Nigerian activist
Davis Martin (born 1997), American baseball player
Davis McCaughey (1914–2005), Irish-Australian theologian
Davis McCombs (born 1969), American poet
Davis Mell (1604–1662), English clockmaker
Davis Mensah (born 1991), Ghanaian-Italian footballer
Davis Miller, American author
Davis Mills (born 1998), American football player
Davis Murwendo (born 1998), Zimbabwean cricketer
Davis Mwale (born 1972), Zambian boxer
Davis G. Mwamfupe (born 1956), Tanzanian politician

O
Davis Ansah Opoku (born 1984), Ghanaian politician

P
Davis Paul (born 1988), American soccer player
Davis Payne (born 1970), Canadian ice hockey player
Davis Peralta (born 1948), Panamanian basketball player
Davis Pereira (born 1958), Brazilian cyclist
Davis Phinney (born 1959), American cyclist

R
Davis Riley (born 1996), American golfer
Davis Roberts (1917–1993), American actor
Davis Romero (born 1983), Panamanian baseball player
Davis R. Ruark (born 1955), American lawyer

S
Davis Sanchez (born 1974), American football player
Davis Schneiderman (born 1974), American writer
Davis Sessums (1858–1929), American bishop
Davis Steven, Papua New Guinean politician

T
Davis Tarwater (born 1984), American swimmer
Davis Tull (born 1991), American football player

W
Davis Hanson Waite (1825–1901), American politician
Davis Webb (born 1995), American football player
Davis Wendzel (born 1997), American baseball player

Fictional characters
Davis Bloome, a character in the American TV series Smallville
Davis MacLean, a character in the television series Power Book II: Ghost
Davis Motomiya (Daisuke Motomiya in Japanese version), a character in the anime series Digimon
Davis Quinton, a character in the Canadian TV series Corner Gas

See also
List of people with the surname Davis, a page for people with the surname "Davis"
Davis (disambiguation), a disambiguation page for "Davis"

References 

English masculine given names
English-language masculine given names